John Philip Sumpter  is a distinguished professor of Brunel University, UK.  He is an ecotoxicologist, and was amongst the team that first discovered endocrine disruption in fish, and the role of endocrine disrupting chemicals.  He also developed the yeast estrogen assay (YES).

In 2009, Sumpter received an honorary doctorate from ETH Zurich. He was appointed Officer of the Order of the British Empire (OBE) in the 2016 New Year Honours for services to ecotoxicology in the aquatic environment.

References

Academics of Brunel University London
Living people
Year of birth missing (living people)
Officers of the Order of the British Empire
British toxicologists